The New Democratic Party of Quebec fielded fifty-five candidates in the 1989 Quebec provincial election, none of whom were elected.

Candidates
(n.c.: no candidate)

References

1989